Papilio lormieri, the central emperor swallowtail, is a species of swallowtail butterfly from the genus Papilio that is found in Cameroon, the Republic of the Congo, Angola, South Sudan, Uganda, Tanzania, and Kenya.

The larvae feed on Clausena anisata, Fagaropsis species, Rutaceae species, and Fagara macrophylla.

Taxonomy
Papilio lormieri is a member of the menestheus species group. The members of the clade are:
Papilio menestheus Drury, 1773
Papilio lormieri Distant, 1874
Papilio ophidicephalus Oberthür, 1878

Subspecies
Papilio lormieri lormieri (Cameroon, Congo Republic, northern Angola, south-western Sudan)
Papilio lormieri semlikana Le Cerf, 1924<ref>  Le Cerf , F. 1924. Catalogue annote des “types” et formes nouvelles des Papilios d’Afrique contenus dans la collection du Hill Museum. Bulletin of the Hill Museum Wiley 1: 369- 399; 576; 578; 580; 582; 584.</ref> (north-eastern Congo Republic, western Uganda, north-western Tanzania)Papilio lormieri neocrocea Koçak, 1983  (eastern and central Uganda, western Kenya) - Lormier's swallowtail

References

Carcasson, R.H., 1960. "The Swallowtail Butterflies of East Africa (Lepidoptera, Papilionidae)". Journal of the East Africa Natural History Society'' pdf Key to East Africa members of the species group, diagnostic and other notes and figures. (Permission to host granted by The East Africa Natural History Society)

lormieri
Butterflies described in 1874
Butterflies of Africa
Taxa named by William Lucas Distant